The taxon Dendrobium paxtonii refers to the orchids:
Dendrobium paxtonii Lindl. (1839), a synonym of Dendrobium chrysanthum
Dendrobium paxtonii Paxton (1839), a synonym of Dendrobium fimbriatum